"Rock Me" was the winner of the Eurovision Song Contest 1989, performed by Riva, representing , the only time that the country won the contest. It was originally performed in Croatian, but the lead vocalist Emilija Kokić sang it in English during the winners' encore.

The song's victory led to international awareness of Yugoslav and Croatian rock.

Riva's frontwoman Kokić continued to appear in various shows but had no significant success after the 1989 victory.

It was succeeded as Yugoslav representative that year by Tajči with "Hajde da ludujemo".

In 2022, The Independent named it 44th best Eurovision-winning song of all time.

References

Eurovision songs of Yugoslavia
Eurovision songs of 1989
Croatian songs
Eurovision Song Contest winning songs
1989 songs
Macaronic songs